Henry Shaw may refer to:

Henry Shaw (antiquary) (1800–1873), English architectural draughtsman, engraver, and illuminator
Henry Shaw (cricketer) (1854–1932), English cricketer
Henry Shaw (Massachusetts politician) (1788–1857), congressman from Massachusetts
Henry Shaw (philanthropist) (1800–1889), founder of the Missouri Botanical Garden
Henry Shaw (taxidermist) (1812–1887), English taxidermist
Henry Marchmore Shaw (1819–1864), congressman from North Carolina 
Henry Shaw (accountant) (1850–1928), New Zealand accountant, bibliophile and politician
Henry A. Shaw (1818-1891), Michigan politician
Josh Billings (1818–1885), pen name of Henry Wheeler Shaw

See also
Harry Shaw (disambiguation)